Ocros District is one of 10 districts in the Ocros Province in Peru.

Capital
Capital of the Ocros Province is the village of Ocros

See also 
 Lukma Punta

External links
  Official website of the Ocros Province

Districts of the Ancash Region
Districts of the Ocros Province